Shankara is a 1991 Indian Bollywood film directed by Sudarshan Nag and produced by D. Tann. It stars Sunny Deol and Neelam Kothari.

Cast
 Sunny Deol as Shankar "Shankara"
 Neelam as Seema
 Sulabha Deshpande as Shankar's Mother
 Shakti Kapoor as Popatlal
 Paresh Rawal as Diwan
 Kiran Kumar as Kehar Singh
 Rajesh Puri as Munshi

Songs
"Jaana Na Nain Milake" - Mohammed Aziz, Alka Yagnik
"Apna Banake Sapna Dikhake" - Anuradha Paudwal
"Apna Banake Sapna Dikhake" - Anuradha Paudwal
"Behna O Behna" (Sad) - Anuradha Paudwal, Mohammed Aziz
"Behnaa O Behnaa" - Anuradha Paudwal, Mohammed Aziz
"Hum Premi Mastane" - Sudesh Bhosle, Mohammed Aziz, Alka Yagnik

External links

1990s Hindi-language films
1991 films
Films scored by Laxmikant–Pyarelal
Indian action drama films
1990s action drama films